William Poole (1821–1855), also known as "Bill the Butcher", was an American gang member and leader of the Know Nothing political movement

William Poole may also refer to:
 William Poole (Australian politician) (1828–1902), New South Wales politician
 William Poole (economist) (born 1937), American economist, former president of the Federal Reserve Bank of St. Louis
 William A. Poole (1831–1903), merchant and politician from Prince Edward Island, Canada
 William B. Poole (1833–1904), American sailor and Medal of Honor recipient
 William Frederick Poole (1821–1894), American bibliographer and librarian
 William H. Poole (politician), member of the California legislature
 William H. Poole (writer) (1820–1896), Canadian minister and writer
 William Henry Poole (1876–1921), college football player and minister
 William Henry Evered Poole (1902–1969), South African military commander and diplomat
 William Leslie Poole (1866–1931), English immigrant to Uruguay important to the development of association football in Uruguay
 William Mansfield Poole (1871–1946), educationalist and author
 William T. Poole, 20th-century American research analyst for the US Congress

See also
 Bill Poole, American politician
 Will Poole (born 1981), American footballer
 William Wortham Pool (1842–1922), American bookkeeper